Nissan Shatai Co., Ltd. is a Japanese automobile contract manufacturer for Nissan that is headquartered in Hiratsuka, Kanagawa. Its direct history began in 1949. , Nissan owns 45.8% of the company stock.

It has offices around Japan and assembly lines in Hiratsuka and Kanda, Fukuoka. This should not be confused with the nearby, older Nissan Motor Kyushu Plant in Kanda that builds the Nissan Rogue and its twin the Nissan X-Trail. Nissan Shatai focuses on light commercial vehicles,  multipurpose special vehicles  and specially-equipped vehicles. It currently produces vehicles such as the Nissan NV200 and Nissan Elgrand. In the past, it also produced Datsun Trucks and Nissan Safaris (sold as Nissan Patrol in various export markets).

History
The company started with the establishment of Japan Aviation Industries Ltd (Nippon Koku Kogyo K.K) 1937. The Japan International Aviation Industries Ltd (Nippon Kokusai Koku Kogyo K.K) was made in 1941 by merger of Japan Aviation Industries and the International Industries Ltd (Kokusai Kogyo K.K). The Japan International Aviation Industries produced it with the development of Kokusai Ki-59 and Kokusai Ki-76 aircraft. It switched to production of auto bodies and railroad cars from 1946.

The Japan International Aviation Industries Ltd was renamed Nikkoku Industries, Ltd. in 1946 and switched business conditions. The Shin-Nikkoku Industries Ltd established in 1949. It was renamed Nissan Shatai Kohki KK (Nissan Auto Body Machinery Company) in 1962 and merged with Nikkoku Industries.

A closer partnership with Nissan Motors began in June 1951, and Nissan Patrol 4W60 production began at the Hiratsuka factory in September. Nissan purchased a majority stake that same year, after the company was unable to raise enough money in the stock exchange following the Industrial Reconstruction and Reorganization Act. In 1956, the company started to manufacture Datsun 123s at Kyoto. In 1966, after a remodeling, the Hiratsuka factory was renamed as the Shonan Plant. In 2001, the Kyoto assembly site was closed down as part of Carlos Ghosn's turnaround plan for Nissan. The Kyoto operation was reopened later that year with the name Auto Works Kyoto Co., Ltd. as a bus and commercial vehicle body assembler. In March 2011, it added the production of the Nissan Atlas F24, transferred from UD Trucks. In 2007, Nissan Shatai's Kanda, Fukuoka branch office was established, and its second Kyūshū factory was completed in 1992 and modernized in 2009. This factory operated as the Nissan Shatai Kyushu Co., Ltd. from the next year. Production of the Nissan NV200, began in December 2010. The car was chosen as a New York City taxicab in May 2011. In 2017, the Shonan Plant was one of the Nissan facilities reported for their improper safety inspection procedures. Nissan Shatai Kyushu assembles the Nissan Armada for export.

The Nissan Motor Kyushu (NMK) Plant should not be confused with the Nissan Shatai Kyushu Co., Ltd. Plant (meaning Nissan Car Body Kyushu, Co. Ltd.). Situated within NMK's Kanda industrial combine, the latter separate company and plant produces full-size SUVs, minivans, and NV350 Caravan light commercial vans for Nissan.

Facilities

 the Hiratsuka's Shonan Plant produces the Nissan NV200 Vanette and Taxi, the NV150 AD, the Patrol (Y61), the Patrol pickup, and the Armada. The plant is divided into Stamping, Body Assembly, Painting, Resin Molding, Car Assembly, and Logistics. Around the Hiratsuka site are also located the head offices and a research and development center (Techno Center). There also are offices in Kyoto and Hadano, Kanagawa. Nissan Shatai Kyushu has offices and a manufacturing plant in Kanda.  it produces the Infiniti QX80, the Patrol, the Elgrand for the Japanese market, the Armada, the Quest, and the NV350 Caravan. The plant is divided into three shops: Body, Painting, and Assembly.

Nissan Shatai also owns subsidiaries Auto Works Kyoto (supplier of auto bodies, assembler of the Atlas and the Civilian), Nissan Shatai Engineering Co., Ltd., Nissan Shatai Computer Service Co., Ltd., and Pro Staff Co., Ltd. (a personnel management company).

Historic production
 Nissan Patrol
 Datsun Truck
 Datsun Sports
 Nissan Cabstar
 Nissan Advan
 Nissan Pathfinder
 Nissan Civilian
 Nissan Elgrand
 Nissan Serena
 Nissan Caravan/Urvan
 Nissan Homy
 Nissan S-Cargo
 Nissan Crew
 Nissan Fairlady Z (1970–2000)
 Nissan Wingroad

Notes

References

External links
 

Shatai
Vehicle manufacturing companies established in 1949
Companies based in Kanagawa Prefecture
Companies listed on the Tokyo Stock Exchange
Truck manufacturers of Japan
Car manufacturers of Japan
Contract vehicle manufacturers